The New Classic Tour is the debut concert tour by Australian recording artist Iggy Azalea. The tour promoted her debut studio album, The New Classic. Beginning April 2014, the tour played 15 concerts in North America, with plans to perform at various music festivals in Europe during the summer.

Background
Initially, Azalea was set to tour and release her album in September 2013. During an interview with Billboard, Azalea stated she was working on stage and costume design. However, an invitation to open shows (in Asia and Australia) for American recording artist, Beyoncé on her 2013 tour, delayed both projects. Shortly after the release of her fourth single, tour details were finalized.

The tour is sponsored by Monster Energy and promoted by Live Nation. Monster Energy is teaming up with consulting firm, Idol Roc Entertainment, to present the "Monster Energy Hip Hop Outbreak"; a music event to help promote emerging performers in the hip-hop industry. Thus, the tour is officially known as the Monster Energy Outbreak Tour presents: Iggy Azalea—The New Classic Tour.

Set list 
The following set list is representative of the show on 19 October 2014. It is not representative of all concerts for the duration of the tour.

 "Beat Down"
 "Fuck Love"
 "Bounce"
 "My World"
 "Rolex"
 "Don't Need Y'all"
 "Change Your Life"
 "Lady Patra"
 "Pussy"
 "Murda Bizness"
 "Drop That Shit"
 "Fancy"
 "Flexin’ & Finessin’"
 "Quicktime"
 "Black Widow"
 "Work"

Shows 

Cancellations and rescheduled shows

References

External links

2014 concert tours
Iggy Azalea concert tours